The Kremenchuk Regiment was one of ten territorial-administrative subdivisions of the Cossack Hetmanate. The regiment's capital was the city of Kremenchuk, now in Poltava Oblast of central Ukraine.

The Kremenchuk Regiment was founded in 1661. The regiment was created by Yakym Somko in order to keep control over Poltavshchyna. Later the regiment was loyal to Petro Doroshenko and after him to Ivan Briukhovetsky.

The Kremenchuk regiment comprised already existing sotnias of Chyhyryn, Poltava, Myrhorod, Lubny regiments. After its abolishment in 1663, all of the sotnias went back to their original regiments.

Structure
Bahachanska (Velykobahachans'ka)
Balakliiska
Bilotserkivska
Birkivska
Chyhyryn-Dibrovska
Hovtvianska
Horodychshenska
Kyshenkivska
Kobeliatska
Lukimska
Maksymivska
Manzheliivska
Novosanzharska
Omelnytska
Ostapivska
Perevolochanska
Pototska
Ustynyvtska
Veremiivska
Zhovnynska

Commanders
Kyrylo Andrievych - 1661
Havrylo Dybovyk (Dybovytskyi) - August 25, 1661 – March 20, 1662
Kostiantyn Gavrylenko - March 27, 1662 – April 15, 1662
Sava Kanivets- April 22, 1662 - April 26, 1662
Kudlai - August 6, 1664

References

Cossack Hetmanate Regiments
History of Poltava Oblast
1661 establishments in the Polish–Lithuanian Commonwealth